Duke of San Pedro de Galatino is a hereditary title in the Peerage of Spain accompanied by the dignity of Grandee, granted in 1621 by Philip IV to Juan Bautista Spínola, a Genoese nobleman.

The name makes reference to the town of Galatina in Apulia, Italy, known before the Unification of italy as "San Pietro in Galatina".

Dukes of San Pedro de Galatino (1621)

Juan Bautista Spínola y Lecari, 1st Duke of San Pedro de Galatino
Juan Felipe Spínola y Spínola, 2nd Duke of San Pedro de Galatino
Francisco María Spínola y Spínola, 3rd Duke of San Pedro de Galatino
Juan Felipe Spínola y Spínola, 4th Duke of San Pedro de Galatino
Francisco María Spínola y Contreras, 5th Duke of San Pedro de Galatino
Isabel María Spínola y Spínola, 6th Duchess of San Pedro de Galatino
Carlos Gallarati Scotti y Belloni, 7th Duke of San Pedro de Galatino

Dukes of San Pedro de Galatino (1905)

Julio Quesada-Cañaveral y Piédrola, 8th Duke of San Pedro de Galatino 
Rodrigo de Medinilla y Quesada-Cañaveral, 9th Duke of San Pedro de Galatino
Gonzalo de Medinilla y Quesada-Cañaveral, 10th Duke of San Pedro de Galatino
Teresa de Medinilla y Bernales, 11th Duchess of San Pedro de Galatino

Contested claimants

In the 19th century, the 7th duke's descendants ceased to pay their title inheritance taxes in Spain, and as a consequence the title became vacant, but was still recognised in the Kingdom of Italy. In 1905, the Spanish king Alfonso XIII rehabilitated the dukedom on behalf of Julio Quesada-Cañaveral, a descendant of the 3rd duke. The title was still claimed by the Italian descendants of the 7th duke, and so there continues to be an unrecognised pretender to the title in the Republic of Italy, where peerage titles were abolished in 1946.

See also
List of dukes in the peerage of Spain
List of current Grandees of Spain

References

Bibliography
 

Grandees of Spain
Dukes of Spain
Lists of Spanish nobility
Noble titles created in 1621